List of speakers of the People's Assembly of Abkhazia.

On 3 April 2002, Nugzar Ashuba was elected Speaker with 23 votes in favour, 10 against and 1 abstention.

On 3 April 2012, Valeri Bganba was elected Speaker, defeating Raul Khajimba by 21 votes to 11 (with one invalid vote).

List of speakers

See also
Heads of State of Abkhazia

External links 
 Сайт Наро́дного Собра́ния Республики Абхазии
 Конституция Абхазии
 Соглашения между парламентами Абхазии, Приднестровья и Южной Осетии

References

Apsnypress

Caucasian Knot

Politics of Abkhazia
Abkhazia, People's Assembly
Abkhazia-related lists